Gereby is the former Danish name of a German place nowadays called  Carlsburg. It is situated in Schwansen at the northern borderline to Angeln (engl. Anglia). Today Carlsburg is a settlement on the Schlei inlet, some 10 km south of the city of Kappeln.  Located on Carlsburg is Schloss Carlsburg, a country manor owned by the present Duke of Schleswig-Holstein and the former location of a boarding school (Landerziehungsheim Carlsburg) which has since moved to Louisenlund, near Fleckeby.

Gereby is said to be founded by the Vikings in order to defend their way to Hedeby. The name probably derives from the surname "Gero".

Villages in Schleswig-Holstein